Philip Lewis Griffiths KC (30 September 1881 – 4 June 1945) was an eminent Australian jurist.

Education
Educated at Caulfield Grammar School, he studied for a Master of Arts degree at the Trinity College of the University of Melbourne.

Journalist
He then wrote for The Mercury in both Hobart and Launceston.

Law
He studied law at the University of Tasmania, earning an LLB. While working as a lawyer, he also lectured at the University of Tasmania from 1913 to 1930, focusing on torts and criminal law.

In 1930 Griffiths was appointed as the Solicitor-General of Tasmania, and in August 1933 he was made a King's Counsel. From August 1938 to March 1939 Griffiths was acting Chief Judge of the Mandated Territory of New Guinea; he then became the Second Judge of New Guinea, serving in the acting Chief Judge position again during 1940.

Death
He died, in Hobart, on 4 June 1945.

See also
 List of Caulfield Grammar School people

Footnotes

References
 
 New Guinea Judge: A Tasmanian Appointed, The West Australian, (Friday, 16 June 1939), p. 18.

1881 births
1945 deaths
People educated at Caulfield Grammar School
People educated at Trinity College (University of Melbourne)
University of Melbourne alumni
University of Tasmania alumni
Solicitors-General of Tasmania
Australian King's Counsel
Judges from Melbourne